If You Can't Stand the Heat... is the eleventh studio album by English rock band Status Quo.  Recorded
at Wisseloord Studios, Hilversum, Holland, and produced by Pip Williams, it was released in October 1978 and reached #3 in the UK album chart.  The sleeve notes that Aphex Aural Exciter was used in the recording process, thus contributing to a more atmospheric sound than its predecessor, "Rockin' All Over The World".  Unusually for a Status Quo record, a brass section, The David Katz Horns, was used, as well as a backing vocal trio: Jacquie Sullivan, Stevie Lange, and Joy Yates.

"Again and Again" was the first single to be released from the album and managed to reach #13.

The second single to be released from the album was an edited version of "Accident Prone" which stalled at #36.

Track listing
 "Again and Again" (Rick Parfitt, Andy Bown, Jackie Lynton) — 3:41
 "I'm Giving Up My Worryin'" (Francis Rossi, Bernie Frost) — 3:02
 "Gonna Teach You to Love Me" (Alan Lancaster, Michael Green) — 3:11
 "Someone Show Me Home" (Rossi, Frost) — 3:49
 "Long Legged Linda" (Bown) — 3:29
 "Oh, What a Night" (Parfitt, Bown) — 3:46
 "Accident Prone" (Pip Williams, Peter Hutchins) — 5:08
 "Stones" (Lancaster) — 3:53
 "Let Me Fly" (Rossi, Frost) — 4:25
 "Like a Good Girl" (Rossi, Robert Young) — 3:26

2005 reissue bonus track

 "Accident Prone" (single version) (Williams, Hutchins)

Personnel
Status Quo
 Francis Rossi — guitar, vocals
 Rick Parfitt — rhythm guitar, vocals
 Alan Lancaster — bass, guitar, vocals
 John Coghlan — drums
Additional musicians
 Andy Bown — keyboards, backing vocals
 Frank Ricotti - percussion
 Jacquie Sullivan — backing vocals
 Stevie Lange — backing vocals
 Joy Yates — backing vocals
 The David Katz Horns - horns

Chart positions

Certifications

References

1978 albums
Status Quo (band) albums
Vertigo Records albums